Giliastrum is a genus of flowering plants belonging to the family Polemoniaceae.

Its native range is Central USA (found in the states of Arizona, Colorado, Kansas, New Mexico, Oklahoma and Texas) to Dominican Republic, Mexico and north-western Argentina.

The genus name of Giliastrum is in honour of Filippo Luigi Gilii (1756–1821), an Italian clergyman, naturalist and astronomer who worked in part in the Vatican City, and it was first described and published in Fl. Rocky Mts. on page 699 in 1917.

Known species, according to Kew;
Giliastrum acerosum 
Giliastrum castellanosii 
Giliastrum foetidum 
Giliastrum gypsophilum 
Giliastrum incisum 
Giliastrum insigne 
Giliastrum ludens 
Giliastrum purpusii 
Giliastrum rigidulum 
Giliastrum stewartii

References

Polemoniaceae
Polemoniaceae genera
Plants described in 1917
Garden plants
Flora of Mexico
Flora of Argentina
Flora of the Dominican Republic